Elhanan may refer to:

 The biblical Elhanan, son of Dodo, mentioned in 2 Samuel 23:24 and 1 Chronicles 11:26, one of King David's elite fighters known as The Thirty.
 The biblical Elhanan, son of Jair (also called Jaare-Oregim), mentioned in 2 Samuel 21:19 and 1 Chronicles 20:5